Thomas Lippmann (born 30 December 1961) is a German politician from Die Linke.

Political career 
He was elected to the Landtag of Saxony-Anhalt in the 2016 state election.

He was leader of the parliamentary group from 2017 to 2021.

References 

Living people
1961 births
Members of the Landtag of Saxony-Anhalt
The Left (Germany) politicians
21st-century German politicians